Gennady Gennadiyevich Kovalev (born 17 May 1983 in Kropotkin, Krasnodar Krai) is a boxer from Russia.

Career
Southpaw Kovalev won the silver medal at the 2003 World Amateur Boxing Championships defeating Bahodirjon Sooltonov but losing to Aghasi Mammadov at bantam, and a gold medal at the 2004 European Amateur Boxing Championships .

He participated in the 2004 Summer Olympics for his native country. There he was beaten in the quarterfinals of the Bantamweight (54 kg) division by Cuba's eventual winner Guillermo Rigondeaux.

Now at junior welterweight he won the Russian Championships 2007 against legend Alexander Maletin 37:21.
At the World championships he beat Bradley Saunders to reach the finals but lost to defending Kazakh champion Serik Sapiyev 5:20.

After his boxing career, Kovalev has found success as a professional MMA fighter, going 5-1 as a professional.

World amateur championships results 
2003 (as a bantamweight)
Defeated Berik Serikbayev (Kazakhstan) 21-6
Defeated Zsolt Bedák (Hungary) 43-20
Defeated Khavazi Khatsygov (Bulgaria) 25-14
Defeated Bahodirjon Sooltonov (Uzbekistan) 21-15
Lost to Aghasi Mammadov (Azerbaijan) 8-17

2007 (as a Light welterweight)
Defeated Andrey Tsiruk (Belarus) 33-11
Defeated Marufjon Fayzuloyev (Tajikistan) 24-10
Defeated Gyula Kate (Hungary) 22-9
Defeated Boris Georgiev (Bulgaria) walkover
Defeated Bradley Saunders (England) 16-8
Lost to Serik Sapiyev (Kazakhstan) 5-20

Olympic results 
2004 (as a bantamweight)
1st round bye
Defeated Malik Bouziane (Algeria) 23-20
Lost to Guillermo Rigondeaux (Cuba) 5-20

2008 (as a Light welterweight) 
Defeated Maimaitituersun Qiong (China) 15-8
Defeated Richarno Colin (Mauritius) 11:2
lost to Roniel Iglesias (Cuba) 2:5

References
 
 

1983 births
Living people
Bantamweight boxers
Boxers at the 2004 Summer Olympics
Boxers at the 2008 Summer Olympics
Olympic boxers of Russia
Russian male boxers
AIBA World Boxing Championships medalists
People from Kropotkin, Krasnodar Krai
Sportspeople from Krasnodar Krai